Semanan is an administrative village in the Kalideres district of Indonesia. It has the postal code of 11850. KH Hasyim Asy'ari Grand Mosque is located in this village.

See also 
 Kalideres
 List of administrative villages of Jakarta

West Jakarta
Administrative villages in Jakarta